Frederick Garrity (14 November 1936 – 19 May 2006) was an English singer and actor. He was best known as the frontman of Freddie and the Dreamers from 1959 until his retirement in 2001.

Biography 

Born in Crumpsall, Manchester, the eldest son of Frederick Garrity and Elsie Clynes, Freddie worked as a milkman while playing in local skiffle groups: the Red Sox, the John Norman Four and, finally, the Kingfishers, who became Freddie and the Dreamers in 1959.

In the early years of the band, Garrity's official birth-date was given as 14 November 1940 to make him appear younger and, therefore, more appealing to the youth market who bought the majority of records sold in the UK.

Garrity's trademark was his comic dancing (see the Freddie) and his habit of leaping up and down during performances. This, combined with his almost skeletal appearance and horn-rimmed glasses, made him an eccentric figure in the UK rock scene of the early 1960s.

In 1966, Freddie and the Dreamers began to gradually lose commercial ground and disbanded in the late 1960s and, between 1968 and 1973, Garrity and his former bandmate Pete Birrell appeared in the ITV children's television show Little Big Time. Garrity made a solo appearance on the first episode of the Granada Television production The Wheeltappers and Shunters Social Club singing "Try a Little Kindness" and "Good Morning Starshine", broadcast on 13 April 1974; in the sitcom Dear John, he appeared as himself for one episode in both the British original in 1987 and the American version in 1989 (episode: The Return of Ricky S01, E11 (first broadcast: 19 January 1989)); in 1990 he appeared in the final episode of Rowland Rivron's comedy show Set of Six; and, in 1993, he appeared in an episode of Heartbeat as an amateur DJ named Tiny Weedon who in the episode plays the Freddie and the Dreamers record, "You Were Made for Me", on the conclusion of which he jokingly credits the artists as "Freda and the Dreamers."

After his television career ended, Garrity formed a new version of Freddie and the Dreamers and toured regularly for the next two decades, but no further records or chart success came their way. He continued to perform until 2001, when he was diagnosed with emphysema after having a heart attack during a flight from America to Britain, thus forcing him into retirement.

Death 
With his health in decline, Garrity settled in a bungalow aptly called "Dreamers End" in Moreton Avenue, in Newcastle-under-Lyme.

He was married three times and had one daughter from his first marriage, and three children from his second marriage. He died at Bangor in North Wales, at the age of 69, after being taken ill while on holiday. Garrity was cremated at the Carmountside Crematorium in Abbey Hulton, Stoke-on-Trent, where his ashes are interred.

References 

Bibliography

External links 

[ Freddie Garrity] at Allmusic.com
Freddie and the Dreamers Tribute at Confessions of a Pop Culture Addict

1936 births
2006 deaths
Male actors from Manchester
English male singers
People from Newcastle-under-Lyme
Musicians from Manchester
20th-century English singers
Beat musicians
20th-century British male singers